The Bangladesh Institute of Management (BIM) is a state-supported professional management Institute. Its headquarters is located at 4 Sobhanbag, Mirpur Road, Dhaka. Others campuses are located in Chattogram and Khulna, Bangladesh. It was established in 1961.

Departments/Divisions

List of academic departments/divisions 
 Financial Management Division
 Production Management Division
 Productivity and Consultancy Services Division
 Project and Social Services Division
 Computer Services Division
 General Management Division
 Marketing Management  Division
 Human Resources Management Division
 Research, Evaluation and Publication Division
 TOT and Behavioural Management Division

Campuses

List of campuses 
 Dhaka
 Chittagong
 Khulna
 Proposed project for campus all divisional city

Professional academic post-graduate courses 
The institute offers the following academic courses:
 Post Graduate Diploma in Human Resource Management (PGDHRM)
 Post Graduate Diploma in Industrial Management (PGDIM)
 Post Graduate Diploma in Financial Management (PGDFM)
 Post Graduate Diploma in Marketing Management (PGDMM)
 Post Graduate Diploma in Computer Science (PGDCS)
 Diploma in Social Compliance (DSC)
 Diploma in Productivity and Quality Management (DPQM)
 Advanced Certificate course on Business Administration( ACBA)

Proposed professional academic post-graduate courses 
 Post Graduate Diploma in Supply Chain Management
 Post Graduate Diploma in Project Management
 Post Graduate Diploma in Industrial Engineering and Management
 Post Graduate Diploma in Integrated Management System
 Post Graduate Diploma in Safety Management
 Diploma in Total Quality Management
 Diploma in Technology Management
 Diploma in Tax Compliance

Professional training courses 
The institute offers the following training courses:
 Project Management
 Supply Chain Management
 Total Quality Management
 Productivity and Competitiveness
 Productivity Improvement Techniques
 Public Procurement Management
 Critical Path Method using MS Project
 Project Financial management
 Industrial Safety Management
 Quality Management System (ISO 9001:2015)
 Integrated Management System
 Technology based Human Resource Management
 Occupational Health Safety and Productivity
 Labor Law
 Financial Management
 Human Resource Management
 Information Technology in Business and Management
 MIS

Partnerships and alliances 
The institute has partnerships and alliances with the following universities
 Daffodil International University, Dhaka, Bangladesh
 Universiapolis – International University of Agadir, Morocco
 IEOM Society 
 BIM IEOM Society Student Chapter 
 BIM Act, 1961

References

External links 
 

Universities and colleges in Dhaka
Research institutes in Bangladesh
Educational institutions established in 1961
Education in Chittagong
Education in Khulna
1961 establishments in East Pakistan